Branca is a given name and surname.

Branca may also refer to:
Fernet Branca, a kind of drink

Places
Água Branca, a Brazilian municipality in the state of Alagoas
Águia Branca, Espírito Santo, a Brazilian municipality in the state of Espirito Santo
 Areia Branca (Rio Grande do Norte) - city in Rio Grande do Norte, Brazil
 Areia Branca (Sergipe) - city in Sergipe, Brazil
Casa Branca, São Paulo, a Brazilian municipality in the state of São Paulo
Casa Branca, Sousel, a Portuguese civil parish in the municipality of Sousel
Santa Branca, a Brazilian municipality in the state of São Paulo

See also
 Pedra Branca (disambiguation)